Diego "Chico" Corrales Jr. (August 25, 1977 – May 7, 2007) was an American professional boxer who competed from 1996 to 2007. He was a multiple-time world champion in two weight divisions, having held the IBF super featherweight title from 1999 to 2000; the WBO super featherweight title in 2004; the WBO lightweight title from 2004 to 2006; and the WBC, Ring magazine, and lineal lightweight titles from 2005 to 2006.

In 2005, Corrales received Fight of the Year honors by The Ring and the Boxing Writers Association of America for his acclaimed first bout with José Luis Castillo.

Early life
Corrales was born in Columbia, South Carolina to a Colombian father, Diego Corrales Sr. and a Mexican mother. Corrales' early life was filled with violence; he was raised in the Oak Park section of Sacramento, was involved with street gangs at age 13, and witnessed his best friend's death via drive-by shooting. Corrales had a degree in culinary arts. He trained at "Sac Pal" (Sacramento Police Athletic League) Boxing Gym.

Amateur career
Corrales compiled an amateur boxing record of 105-12. In 1994, he took second place at the United States Amateur Championships, losing to Frankie Carmona on points in the featherweight final.
He reached the first round of the featherweight bracket at the 1995 Pan American Games, losing to Arnaldo Mesa. At the 1995 World Championships, he lost out on a medal after losing to Marco Rudolph in the lightweight bracket.

Professional career

Super featherweight

Corrales vs. Mayweather
On January 20, 2001, Corrales challenged Ring No. 2 ranked Super Featherweight and #7 Pound-For-Pound Floyd Mayweather Jr. for the WBC super featherweight title and recorded his first knockdown and first loss. In the bout, Mayweather knocked down Corrales five times (three times in the seventh round and twice in the tenth). After the fifth knockdown, Corrales' corner stopped the fight, despite Corrales' protests.

Shortly after the Mayweather fight, Corrales served 14 months in prison after opting for a plea bargain on charges he faced for abusing his pregnant wife, Maria.

Corrales vs. Casamayor I & II
In 2003, Corrales returned to the ring. After easily winning four fights, Corrales fought against Ring No. 1 ranked Super Featherweight Joel Casamayor. After the sixth round, the fight was stopped because of a deep cut inside of Corrales' mouth. On March 6, 2004, there was a rematch for the vacant WBO super featherweight title. Corrales won by close split decision.

Lightweight

Corrales vs. Freitas
On August 7, 2004, Corrales fought former two-time Super Featherweight champion and current WBO Lightweight champion, Acelino Freitas, who came into the bout unbeaten. Corrales won the fight, via TKO in the tenth round, making Corrales a two weight champion. Freitas won the early rounds, but by the later rounds he was visibly tired and began to be caught by Corrales. After rising from his third knockdown, Freitas walked away from the referee and quit.

Corrales vs. Castillo I

On May 7, 2005, Corrales defeated WBC and Ring Lightweight champion José Luis Castillo via TKO in the tenth round, giving Corrales his fourth title in 2 weight classes. The fight is almost universally regarded as the best fight of 2005. Both men stood in front of each other, battering each other with hard combinations and power punches throughout the entire fight. Finally, in the tenth round, Castillo knocked Corrales down. Seconds later, Castillo knocked Corrales down again. Corrales managed to beat the count, and, after a point was taken away for excessive spitting out of the mouthpiece, Corrales connected with a punch that Castillo later called "a perfect right hand." Corrales then trapped Castillo against the ropes and landed numerous punches, causing the referee, Tony Weeks, to stop the fight.

Corrales vs. Castillo II
A rematch between Corrales and Castillo occurred on October 8, 2005. On the day before the fight, Castillo weighed-in 3½ lb over the  lightweight limit. Since Castillo did not make the weight, the fight became a non-title bout. The two fighters continued with the same fighting style that they had used in the first fight, trading inside punches throughout the first three rounds. Early in the fourth round, Castillo knocked down Corrales with a left hook to his chin. Corrales wobbled to his feet at the referee's count of ten, causing the fight to end.

Corrales vs. Castillo III, dubbed "The War to Settle the Score," had been scheduled for February 4, 2006, but it was postponed because of a rib injury that Corrales suffered while training. The fight was rescheduled for June 3, 2006. At the weigh-in, however, Corrales weighed the  lightweight limit whereas Castillo weighed 139½ lb—causing the fight to be cancelled. Corrales later sued Castillo for punitive damages.

Corrales vs. Casamayor III
Corrales was scheduled to defend his lightweight title in a third bout against Joel Casamayor on October 7, 2006. However, Corrales weighed in 5 pounds over the limit. He was given two hours to shed five pounds, but came back at 139 pounds. Corrales would have been stripped of the title if he had won the bout, but Casamayor defeated him by split decision for the WBC and The Ring lightweight titles.

On April 7, 2007, fighting in the welterweight division, Corrales lost a unanimous decision to Joshua Clottey. Corrales was dropped in rounds 9 and 10 and lost by the scores of 97–90, 98–89 and 100–87.

Prison
Corrales served 14 months in the Deuel Vocational Institution, a correctional facility in San Joaquin County, California, after being convicted of domestic battery on his then pregnant girlfriend.

Death
On May 7, 2007, exactly two years to the day after his first fight with Castillo, Corrales was killed in a three-vehicle accident near his Las Vegas home. Corrales was riding a 2007 Suzuki GSXR 1000 motorcycle, traveling northbound on Fort Apache Road in the southwest part of the Las Vegas Valley when he struck the back of a car and was thrown more than 100 feet into oncoming traffic and struck by another vehicle. An ambulance was called by the witnesses at the scene, Corrales was rushed to a hospital but was pronounced dead on arrival. Las Vegas police spokesman Sgt. Tracy McDonald said: "The accident occurred at approximately 7:30 p.m. PDT." McDonald  could not say how fast the motorcycle was traveling. Corrales' blood alcohol content was 0.25 at the time of the crash, approximately 3 times the legal limit for Nevada.

Professional boxing record

References

External links

The rises and falls of Diego Corrales by Jason Probst, 17 April 2003, Sacramento News & Review.

Diego Corrales profile at About.com

Family:

1977 births
2007 deaths
American boxers of Mexican descent
Boxers at the 1995 Pan American Games
Lightweight boxers
Super-featherweight boxers
World Boxing Council champions
International Boxing Federation champions
World Boxing Organization champions
Motorcycle road incident deaths
Road incident deaths in Nevada
Boxers from Sacramento, California
American male boxers
The Ring (magazine) champions
World super-featherweight boxing champions
World lightweight boxing champions
Pan American Games competitors for the United States